Titan Lake In-situ Sampling Propelled Explorer (TALISE) is a Spanish space probe proposed in 2012 that would splash-down in Ligeia Mare, the second largest lake on Saturn's moon Titan. TALISE would navigate across the lake for six months to one year. 

If this mission is approved by the European Space Agency (ESA) it would analyze the liquid hydrocarbons sea and take scientific measurements while it navigates to the coast in the northern region of Titan. It is also proposed in the mission to study the surrounding terrain of Ligeia Mare. This mission proposal was a joined project between the Spanish Astrobiology Center and SENER.

Naming

"Talise" is the Iroquois word for "beautiful water."

See also

 Dragonfly, a proposed Titan lander and rotorcraft
 Explorer of Enceladus and Titan (E2T)
 Journey to Enceladus and Titan (JET)
 Titan Mare Explorer
 Titan Saturn System Mission

References

Planetary rovers
Missions to Saturn
Titan (moon)
Proposed space probes
Space program of Spain